Palaemnema gigantula is a species of damselfly in the family Platystictidae. It is found in Costa Rica and Nicaragua. Its natural habitats are subtropical or tropical moist lowland forests and rivers. It is threatened by habitat loss.

Sources

Platystictidae
Insects described in 1931
Taxonomy articles created by Polbot